Valukkai Aru is a seasonal river in Northern Province, Sri Lanka. It is the only river on the Jaffna Peninsula.  The river rises near Tellippalai, before flowing south-west through Kandarodai, Sandilipay and Vaddukoddai. The river empties into Jaffna Lagoon near Araly.

See also 
 List of rivers of Sri Lanka

References 

Bodies of water of Jaffna District
Rivers of Sri Lanka